Upper Borth is a small village in Ceredigion, Wales, part of Borth.

Villages in Ceredigion